Chandiya or Chandia is a village near the town Anjar, the taluka of Kutch district in the Indian state of Gujarat.

Village is located 21 km from nearest town Anjar.

History
Many castes and religious groups live in Chandiya, such as Sorathiya (ahir), Jadeja — Kshatriya, Jains, Brahmins, Ahir-Machhuya,  Mistry Gurjar Kshatriya, Luhar, Muslims, etc. About the history of Chandiya, it is one of the 19 villages established by Mistris or Kutch Gurjar Kshatriyas. These Mistris first moved into Saurashtra in early 7th century and later a major group entered Kutch in 12th Century & established themselves at Dhaneti. Later from 12th century onwards they moved to settle themselves between Anjar and Bhuj and founded the villages of Anjar, Sinugra, Khambhra, Nagalpar, Khedoi, Madhapar, Hajapar, Kukma, Galpadar, Reha, Vidi, Ratnal, Jambudi, Devaliya, Lovaria, Nagor, Chandiya, Meghpar and Kumbharia.

The old houses, temples and other old infrastructure was built by these Gurjar Kshatriya or Mistri community during those years. The Thakor Mandir and Jadeshwar Mahadev Temple built by Mistri are in the village of which the carvings and colors of Thakor Mandir are worth seeing. However, majority of old houses of Mistris with unique architect were destroyed in the earthquake of 26 January 2001.

Temples

Kuldevi Temples of many clans of these Kutch Gurjar Kshatriya community are also there in this village. For example, Chawda of five Villages Chandiya, Lovariya, Madhapar, Sinugra and Galpadar have their Kuldevi Chamunda Mata's temple in village. A new large temple replacing old has been recently constructed and inaugurated on eve of Dusherra in October, 2010.

Besides, Thakore Mandir and Jadeshwar Mahadev temple of Chandiya built by Mistris of village in 1900 are worth seeing for their beautiful carvings and colors.

Education
Education facility is up to Secondary school.

References

Villages in Kutch district